Fondo Interbancario di Tutela dei Depositi (FITD) is an Italian deposit guarantee fund founded in 1987. The fund became a mandatory scheme by the EU Deposit Guarantee Schemes Directive (94/19/EEC). However, the cooperative banks (BCC) of Italy had their own fund instead (Fondo di Garanzia dei Depositanti del Credito Cooperativo). There was another fund to guarantee asset management firm in Italy: Fondo Nazionale di Garanzia.

History
Fondo Interbancario di Tutela dei Depositi (FITD) was founded in 1987. It was mandatory for Italian bank to join either FITD or the Fondo di Garanzia dei Depositanti del Credito Cooperativo. The latter was for the cooperative banks (banca di credito cooperativo (BCC) network, excluding cooperative bank type banco popolare) of Italy. Some bank which was demutualized from BCC network, such as Banca di Cambiano, switched to FITD after the demutualization.

Due to the change in the directive (2014/49/EU), which was part of the Single Rulebook, the regulatory foundations for Banking Union, the fund had changed from ex-post to an
ex-ante system. The fund would eventually join a single deposit guarantee scheme of the EU. However, in a near future, the fund would only re-insurances by European Deposit Insurance Scheme.

From 1987 to 2015, 43 member banks were under special administration by the Italian government, with the Bank of Italy as the actual administrator. The fund carried 11 interventions, which 2 out of 11 banks returned to normal operation: Cassa di Risparmio di Prato and Banca Tercas. 4 additional bank were bail-out by the newly established Italian National Resolution Fund of the EU Single Resolution Mechanism in 2015: Banca delle Marche, Banca Popolare dell'Etruria e del Lazio, Cassa di Risparmio della Provincia di Chieti and Cassa di Risparmio di Ferrara respectively. Istituto per il Credito Sportivo, GBM Banca and Banca Popolare delle Province  were still under special administration as at 2015.

FITD recapitalized the banks instead of liquidating, as repayment the depositors to the maximum of €100,000 each were more costly. However, in December 2015, European Commission ruled that the capital injection to Banca Tercas in 2014, would be classified as state aid. The commission requested the beneficiary returned the aid to the fund. Lack of approval from the commission were the reasons of not involvements in the bail-out of the 4 banks in 2015.

In 2016 member of FITD set-up a voluntary scheme that separate from the mandatory funding. Banca Tercas returned the aid to FITD but funded by the voluntary scheme for the same amount. In 2016, the voluntary scheme subscribed the €280 million recapitalization of Cassa di Risparmio di Cesena (Caricesena). In 2017, Caricesena, along with Banca Carim and Cassa di Risparmio di San Miniato, were sold to Crédit Agricole Cariparma (trading as Crédit Agricole Italia) for €130 million. Before the formal handover, FITD voluntary scheme would also recapitalize the banks for €470m.

In November 2018, the voluntary scheme made another bail-out. The scheme was the underwriter for €320 million of €400 million Banca Carige's Tier 2 subordinated bonds.

Interventions

 Cassa di Risparmio di Prato
 Banco di Tricesimo
 Banca di Girgenti
 Banca di Credito di Trieste
 Credito Commerciale Tirreno
 Sicilcassa
 Banca Valle d'Itria e Magna Grecia
 Banco Emiliano Romagnolo
 Banca MB
 Banca Network Investimenti
 Banca Tercas
voluntary scheme
 Banca Tercas
 Cassa di Risparmio di Cesena
 Cassa di Risparmio di San Miniato
 Banca Carim
 Banca Carige

Chairmen
 Paolo Savona (2010–2014)
 Salvatore Maccarone (2014–)

Members

References

External links
 

Banking in Italy
Deposit insurance